İbrahim Yavuz (born 10 November 1982) is a Turkish former professional footballer. He played as a right fullback.

Life and career
Yavuz began his career at local club Gaziosmanpaşaspor. He spent most of his career at Adanaspor. He was first called up to the Turkey U-15 team in 1997. Yavuz competed at every youth level, but was never selected for the senior squad.

References

1982 births
Living people
Turkish footballers
Turkey youth international footballers
Turkey under-21 international footballers
Association football defenders
Association football fullbacks
Gaziosmanpaşaspor footballers
Adanaspor footballers
Galatasaray S.K. footballers
Kayserispor footballers
MKE Ankaragücü footballers
Diyarbakırspor footballers
Mardinspor footballers
Boluspor footballers
Kayseri Erciyesspor footballers
TKİ Tavşanlı Linyitspor footballers
Şanlıurfaspor footballers
İstanbul Güngörenspor footballers
Süper Lig players
TFF First League players
TFF Second League players